Cort Hessler is an American assistant director and stuntman. He has been nominated for twelve Primetime Emmy Awards in the category Outstanding Stunt Coordination. Hessler also won an Primetime Emmy Award for his stunt coordination in the crime thriller television series The Blacklist in 2014. He attended at the West Orange High School.

References

External links 

Living people
Place of birth missing (living people)
Year of birth missing (living people)
Assistant directors
American stunt performers
Primetime Emmy Award winners